Robert Hicks (born 9 October 1991) is an Australian rules footballer who played for the Richmond Football Club in the Australian Football League (AFL).

Hicks was drafted to Richmond from the Calder Cannons in the TAC Cup with the 7th selection in the 2010 Rookie draft.

References

External links

1991 births
Living people
Richmond Football Club players
Coburg Football Club players
Australian rules footballers from Victoria (Australia)
Calder Cannons players